The Diocese of Chunchon (also romanized Chuncheon and Ch’unch’on) is a diocese of the Latin Church of the Roman Catholic Church in South Korea. A suffragan in the ecclesiastical province of the Metropolitan Archdiocese of Seoul, it has ecclesiastic authority over the administrative province of Gangwon-do.
 
Its cathedral episcopal see mother church is Jungnim-dong Cathedral in Chuncheon.

History 
The jurisdiction was erected on April 25, 1939 as a missionary pre-diocesan jurisdiction on territory split off from the Apostolic Vicariate of Seoul under the name Apostolic Prefecture of Shunsen, the city's name during the period of Japanese rule of Korea.
 
It was renamed the Apostolic Prefecture of Chunchon on July 16, 1950 and made an Apostolic vicariate on September 20, 1955.
 
It was elevated to diocesan status on March 10, 1962.

On 22 March 1965, it lost territory to establish the Diocese of Wonju 원주

Ordinaries

Apostolic Prefects of Chunchon
Owen McPolin (1939–1940)
Thomas F. Quinlan, S.S.C.M.E. (1940–1942)
Paul Noh Gi-nam (1942–1945; apostolic administrator)
Thomas F. Quinlan, S.S.C.M.E. (1945–1955)

Apostolic Vicars of Chunchon
Thomas F. Quinlan, S.S.C.M.E. (1955–1962)

Bishops of Chunchon
Thomas F. Quinlan, S.S.C.M.E. (1962–1965)
Thomas Stewart, S.S.C.M.E. (1966–1994)
John Chang Yik (1994–2010)
Lucas Kim Woon-hoe (2010–2020)
Simon Kim Ju-young (2020–present)

References

External links 
  

Chunchun
Christian organizations established in 1939
Gangwon Province, South Korea
Chunchun
1939 establishments in Korea
Chuncheon
Roman Catholic Ecclesiastical Province of Seoul